PRX may refer to:

 Pressure reactivity index, a medical tool for monitoring patients with acute brain injuries
 PRX (telephony), a telephone switching platform developed by Philips
 Public Radio Exchange, a former Web-based public-radio distribution company, now merged with Public Radio International
 PRX (gene), periactin (PRX is the current official symbol)
 Peroxiredoxins, a family of enzymes (PRX is an older alias symbol)
Physical Review X, a scientific journal published by the American Physical Society
 PRX, the IATA airport code for Cox Field Airport in Paris, Texas, United States
 A file extension for PlayStation Portable firmware